The Preservation Hall Jazz Band is a New Orleans jazz band founded in New Orleans by tuba player Allan Jaffe in the early 1960s. The band derives its name from Preservation Hall in the French Quarter. In 2005, the Hall's doors were closed for a period of time due to Hurricane Katrina, but the band continued to tour.

Early years
In the 1950s, Larry Borenstein, an art dealer from Milwaukee, managed Preservation Hall in the French Quarter as an art gallery. To attract customers, he invited local New Orleans jazz musicians to play. After their honeymoon in 1961, Allan Jaffe and his wife Sandra visited to hear some traditional New Orleans jazz. The Jaffes were from Pennsylvania. Allan Jaffe was a tuba player who had graduated from the Wharton School of Business in Philadelphia, while his wife had been employed at an advertising agency. They attended concerts, grew to love the French Quarter, and stayed longer than they had intended. Borenstein asked if they wanted to manage Preservation Hall, and they agreed.

Allan Jaffe hired local musicians whose ages ranged from the 60s to the 90s. Many were struggling with poverty, racism, and illness. At first the Jaffes served no alcohol, used no amplification, and didn't advertise. In 1963, Allan Jaffe began to tour with bands in the U.S. and in other countries. These tours included such popular figures as pianist Sweet Emma Barrett, trumpeter Kid Thomas Valentine, brothers Percy Humphrey and Willie Humphrey, trumpeter De De Pierce and his wife, pianist Billie Pierce. The most popular was clarinetist George Lewis, whose reputation preceded the Hall. Fans from all over the world came to New Orleans to hear traditional jazz.

Olympia Brass Band
Barrett's health began to decline in the 1970s, which forced her to stop touring. She was replaced as leader by brothers Percy Humphrey (trumpet) and Willie Humphrey (clarinet). The lineup included Frank Demond (trombone), James Prevost (bass), James "Sing" Miller (piano), Cie Frazier (drums), Jim Robinson (trombone), Narvin Kimball (banjo), and Allan Jaffe (tuba).

During the late 1960s and early 1970s, many of the touring members were hired by Harold Dejan for his Olympia Brass Band. This band became not only a staple at Preservation Hall, but also influenced the Preservation Hall Jazz Band and future Preservation Hall musicians.

Dejan's regular sidemen included Andy Anderson (trumpet), Milton Batiste (trumpet), Kid Sheik Cola (trumpet), Paul Crawford (trombone) Gerald Joseph (trombone), Emanuel Paul (tenor saxophone), Andrew Jefferson (snare), John Smith, Henry "Booker T" Glass, Nowell "Papa" Glass. Cag Cagnolatti, Kid Thomas Valentine, Louis Nelson, Louis Cottrell, Jr., Cié Frazier, Emanuel Sayles, and Allan Jaffe on tuba were among those who played with the group. During the Olympia years, a young Harry Connick Jr. performed with Barrett and the band at Preservation Hall.

In 1977, Jaffe and Arthur Hall and his Afro-American Dance Ensemble released Fat Tuesday and All That Jazz! A Mardi Gras Dance Musical. The world premiere of the dance musical was on February 19, 1977, and was followed by a tour in the United States. Dejan's Olympia Brass Band was featured in Fat Tuesday and All That Jazz, in addition to the Arthur Hall Afro-American Dance Ensemble of Philadelphia, Pennsylvania.

Later years
In 1987, Allan Jaffe died of cancer at the age of fifty-one. After his son Ben graduated from Oberlin College, he became artistic director in 1993. Ben Jaffe toured with the Preservation Hall Jazz Band, playing double bass and tuba. He began the educational initiatives that his father developed.

"As many as 20 different bands, drawn from a pool of about 150 local musicians, had played at Preservation Hall in the 1960s, but by 1999 virtually all of the older generation of musicians had died and the band members were a mixture of younger African-American players and white musicians from overseas. Most notable among the former were Michael White (ii), Wendell Brunious (who gradually took over the leadership of Valentine's band in the elder trumpeter's final years, as well as the touring band), Freddie Lonzo, and the tuba player Walter Payton; Europeans included the Swedish pianist Lars Edegran, the English trumpeter Clive Wilson, Orange Kellin, and Jacques Gauthé" (Hazeldine, Kernfeld).

The Preservation Hall Jazz Band continued to tour nationally and internationally. The band was led by trumpeter Wendell Brunious, later replaced by his older brother, John Brunious.

In 2006, the Preservation Hall Jazz Band was awarded the National Medal of Arts, the nation's highest honor for artistic excellence. The award was presented Benjamin Jaffe and co-founder of Preservation Hall, Sandra Jaffe, who accepted the award from President and Mrs. Laura Bush in an Oval Office ceremony on November 9, 2006. The citations read: "With enormous talent and pride, this ageless ensemble has toured the world displaying the unbreakable spirit of New Orleans and sharing the joy of New Orleans jazz with us all."

Nearing Preservation Hall's 45th anniversary, the band collaborated with musicians from other genres, such as Blind Boys of Alabama on their Grammy Award winning album Down in New Orleans. The band's benefit album in 2010 contained contributions from Andrew Bird, Del McCoury Band, Jim James, Dr. John, Pete Seeger, and Tom Waits. The Hall band supported My Morning Jacket on tour. The album American Legacies was a collaboration with the Del McCoury band, uniting New Orleans jazz and bluegrass music.

In 2014, The Preservation Hall Jazz Band made a guest appearance on the Foo Fighters' eighth studio album Sonic Highways.

The Trey McIntyre Project dance ensemble collaborated with the Preservation Hall Jazz Band to create Ma Maison and The Sweeter End, two contemporary dance works set. The two ensembles toured numerous dates nationally, including performances at the Hollywood Bowl and the Lincoln Center.

In 2018 the documentary A Tuba to Cuba was released.

50th anniversary
Preservation Hall celebrated its Golden Anniversary from 2011 to 2012. Projects included:
 50th Anniversary Concert at Carnegie Hall with Allen Toussaint, Frank Demond, Yasiin Bey, Givers, Steve Earle
 Art and Jazz: Preservation Hall at 50 at the Ogden Museum of Southern Art.
 Opened the Preservation Hall at 50 exhibition at the Old US Mint in New Orleans.
 Performed at New Orleans Jazz & Heritage Festival, with Bonnie Raitt, Jim James, Allen Toussaint, Steve Earle, Rebirth Brass Band.
 The Hall band became the first to perform at both the Newport Jazz Festival and the Newport Folk Festival in the same year.
 Two albums were released: Preservation Hall Jazz Band 50th Anniversary Collection (Sony Legacy) and  St. Peter & 57th St. (Rounder) a recording of the 50th Anniversary concert at Carnegie Hall entitled

Awards
 2006 National Medal of Arts
 2013 NAACP Image Award for Preservation Hall Jazz Band 50th Anniversary Collection

Members
 Ben Jaffe – double bass, tuba
 Charlie Gabriel – saxophone, clarinet
 Walter Harris – drums
 Ronell Johnson – trombone
 Branden Lewis – trumpet
 Clint Maedgen –  vocals , saxophone
 Kyle Roussel – piano

Past members
 Lucien Barbarin – trombone
 Paul Barbarin – drums
 Sweet Emma Barrett – piano
 John Brunious – trumpet
 Wendell Brunious – trumpet
 Albert Burbank – clarinet
 Raymond Burke – clarinet
 Maynard Chatters – trombone
 Paul Crawford - trombone, baritone horn
 Manny Crusto – clarinet
 Frank Demond – trombone
 Lars Edegran – piano
 Frank Fields – bass
 Cie Frazier – drummer
 Percy Humphrey – trumpet
 Willie Humphrey – clarinet
 Allan Jaffe – tuba
 Ralph H. Johnson – clarinet
 Leroy Jones – trumpet
 Jeanette Kimball – piano
 Narvin Kimball – banjo player
 Carl LeBlanc – banjo
 George Lewis – clarinet
 Jeffery Miller – trombone 
 Punch Miller – trumpet
 Sing Miller – piano
 Louis Nelson – trombone
 Alcide Pavageau – bass
 Walter Payton – double bass
 Billie Pierce – piano
 De De Pierce – trumpet, cornet
 Shannon Powell – drums
 James Prevost – bass
 Joe Robichaux – piano
 Jim Robinson – trombone
 Lester Santiago – piano
 Emanuel Sayles – banjoist
 Kid Sheik – trumpet
 Gregg Stafford – trumpet
 Kid Thomas Valentine – trumpet
 Don Vappie – banjo
 Mari Watanabe – piano
 Michael White – clarinet
 Ricky Monie - Piano
 Joseph Lastie - Drums

Discography
 New Orleans' Sweet Emma and Her Preservation Hall Jazz Band (Preservation Hall, 1964)
 New Orleans' Billie & De De and Their Preservation Hall Jazz Band (Preservation Hall, 1966)
 New Orleans Volume 1 (Columbia, 1977)
 New Orleans Vol. II (CBS, 1982)
 When the Saints Go Marchin' In (CBS, 1983)
 New Orleans Vol. IV (CBS, 1988)
 Preservation Hall Jazz Band Live! (Sony, 1992)
 In the Sweet Bye & Bye (Sony, 1996)
 Because of You (Sony, 1998)
 Songs of New Orleans (Preservation Hall, 1999)
 Shake That Thing (Preservation Hall, 2004)
 New Orleans Preservation Vol. 1 (Preservation Hall, 2009)
 An Album to Benefit Preservation Hall and the Preservation Hall Music Outreach Program (Preservation Hall, 2010)
 American Legacies (Preservation Hall, 2011)
 St. Peter & 57th St. (Rounder, 2012)
 Jazzfest Live 2012 (MunckMix, 2012)
 That's It! (Legacy, 2013)
 Run Stop & Drop!! (Legacy, 2017)
 So It Is (Legacy, 2017)
 A Tuba to Cuba (Sub Pop, 2019)

References

Sources
 William Carter. Preservation Hall: Music from the Heart, 1991. 
 "Preservation Hall Jazz Band reunites in NYC", MSNBC, September 21, 2005. Retrieved July 24, 2008]

External links
 Official site
 Preservation Hall Jazz Band Daytrotter Session

American jazz ensembles from New Orleans
Big bands
Dixieland ensembles
Dixieland revival ensembles
Jazz musicians from New Orleans
Musical groups from New Orleans
United States National Medal of Arts recipients